William J. Ecker (November 1, 1938 – September 1, 2011) was a United States Coast Guard rear admiral.

Early life and education
Ecker was a native of Brooklyn. He died on September 1, 2011, in Virginia Beach, Virginia.

Career
Ecker graduated from the United States Coast Guard Academy in 1960. During the Vietnam War, he served aboard . His first flag assignment was as Commander, Second Coast Guard District in Saint Louis, Missouri. Ecker later served as Commander, Fifth Coast Guard District headquartered at Portsmouth, Virginia.

Awards Ecker received during his career include the Legion of Merit, the Meritorious Service Medal, the Coast Guard Commendation Medal and the Navy Commendation Medal.

References

2011 deaths
People from Brooklyn
United States Coast Guard admirals
Recipients of the Legion of Merit
United States Coast Guard personnel of the Vietnam War
United States Coast Guard Academy alumni
1938 births